The 2014 Liga Super also known as the Astro Liga Super for sponsorship reasons is the 11th season of the Liga Super, the top-tier professional football league in Malaysia.

The season was held from 17 January and concluded on 25 June 2014.

The Liga Super champions for 2014 was Johor Darul Ta'zim.

Major changes

The following are the key changes of 2014 Liga Super season as compared to the previous season:

 The 2014 Piala Sumbangsih match between LionsXII and Pahang will also be a Liga Super match. Results of the 90-minute match will be counted towards the league table classification. The last time this happened was during the 2011 Liga Super season.
 Goal-line referees will be introduced in selected matches during the season, and will be fully implemented for all matches in the 2015 Liga Super season if the feedback is positive.
 A total of 4 foreign players can be registered by Liga Super teams, including at least one player from AFC countries. A maximum of 3 foreign players can be fielded at one time in a match. The announcement was made by FAM during the exco meeting in November 2013, following a decision to upgrade the foreign players quota from 2 in 2013 to 3 in the April 2013 meeting.

Teams
A total of 12 teams compete in the 2014 season which includes the top 10 teams that participated in the 2013 season and champions and runners-up of the 2013 Liga Premier.

Felda United and Negeri Sembilan were relegated at the end of the 2013 Liga Super season after finishing in the bottom place of the league table.

2012 Liga Premier unbeaten champions Sarawak and runners-up Sime Darby secured direct promotion to the Liga Super.

  1 Correct as of end of 2013 Liga Super season
  2 LionsXII uses the Bishan Stadium until the end of January 2014 due to renovation work being done at Jalan Besar Stadium.
  3 Selangor uses the MBPJ Stadium until 25 February 2014 due to renovation work being done at Shah Alam Stadium.

Stadiums and locations

Personnel and sponsoring

Note: Flags indicate national team as has been defined under FIFA eligibility rules. Players may hold more than one non-FIFA nationality.

Kits

Coaching changes

Except for the two promoted teams Sime Darby FC and Sarawak FA, all other teams have new head coaches at the start of the season.

Foreign players

Note:

 LionsXII will not be permitted to have any foreign players as it is intended to remain as a development team for Singaporean players.

League table

Results

Fixtures and Results of the Liga Super 2014 season.

Week 1

Week 2

Week 3

Week 4

Week 5

Week 6

Week 7

Week 8

Week 9

Week 10

Week 11

Week 12

Week 13

Week 14

Week 15

Week 16

Week 17

Week 18

Week 19

Week 20

Week 21

Week 22

Fixtures and results

Season statistics

Top scorers

Own goals

Hat-tricks

Clean sheets

Scoring

 First goal of the season: Matías Conti for Pahang against LionsXII (17 January 2014)
 Fastest goal of the season: 2 minutes – Mohd Failee Mohamad Ghazli for Sime Darby against Selangor (8 February 2014)
 Largest winning margin: 4–0 wins by Sime Darby against Kelantan (15 April 2014)

 Highest scoring game: 7 goals
 Johor Darul Ta'zim 4–3 Terengganu (13 June 2014)
 Most goals scored in a match by a single team: 4 goals
Sime Darby 4–0 Kelantan (15 April 2014)
Sime Darby 4–0 Perak (14 June 2014)
 Most goals scored in a match by a losing team: 3 goals Terengganu in a 4–3 loss against Johor Darul Ta'zim in Tan Sri Dato Haji Hassan Yunos Stadium (13 June 2014)

Awards

Monthly awards

Transfers

For transfers see: List of Malaysian football transfer 2014

Attendances

See also

 2014 Liga Premier
 2014 Liga FAM
 2014 Piala FA

References

External links
 Football Association of Malaysia

Malaysia Super League seasons
1
Malaysia
Malaysia